is a subculture from Japan that is highly influenced by Victorian clothing and styles from the Rococo period. A very distinctive property of Lolita fashion is the aesthetic of cuteness. This clothing subculture can be categorized into three main substyles: 'gothic', 'classic', and 'sweet'. Many other substyles such as 'sailor', 'country', 'hime' (princess), 'guro' (grotesque), 'qi' and 'wa' (based on traditional Chinese and Japanese dress), 'punk', 'shiro' (white), 'kuro' (black), and 'steampunk' lolita also exist. This style evolved into a widely followed subculture in Japan and other countries in the 1990s and 2000s and may have waned in Japan as of the 2010s as the fashion became more mainstream.

Description 
The main feature of Lolita fashion is the volume of the skirt, created by wearing a petticoat or crinoline. The skirt can be either bell-shaped or A-line shaped. Components of the lolita wardrobe consist mainly of a blouse (long or short sleeves) with a skirt or a dress, which usually comes to the knees. Lolitas frequently wear wigs in combination with other headwear such as hair bows or a bonnet (similar to a Poke bonnet). Lolitas can also wear Victorian style drawers under their petticoats. For further effect some Lolitas use knee socks, ankle socks or tights together with either high heels or flat shoes with a bow are worn. Other typical Lolita garments are a jumperskirt (JSK) and one-piece (OP).

History 
Although the origin of the fashion is unclear, at the end of the 1970s a new movement known as Otome-kei was founded, which slightly influenced Lolita fashion since Otome means maiden and maiden style looks like a lesser elaborated Lolita style. Before Otome-kei emerged, there was already a rise of the cuteness culture in the earlier seventies; during which there was a high emphasis on cute and childish handwriting in Japanese schools. As a result of that the company Sanrio began experimenting with cute designs. The cuteness style, known as kawaii style, became popular in the 1980s. After Otome-kei, Do-It-Yourself behavior became popular, which led to the emergence of a new style called 'doll-kei', the predecessor of Lolita fashion.

In the years of 1977–1998, a large part of the Harajuku shopping district closed for car traffic on Sundays. The result was an increase in interaction between pedestrians in Harajuku. When brands like  (1973), Milk (1970), and Angelic Pretty (1979) began to sell cute clothing, that resulted in a new style, which would later be known as 'Lolita'. The term lolita first appeared in the fashion magazine Ryukou Tsushin in the September 1987 issue. Shortly after that Baby, The Stars Shine Bright (1988), Metamorphose temps de fille (1993), and other brands emerged. In the 1990s, lolita became more accepted, with visual kei bands like Malice Mizer and others rising in popularity. These band members wore elaborate clothes that fans began to adopt. During this time Japan went through an economic depression, leading to an increase in alternative youth and fashion cultures such as gyaru, otaku, visual kei, and lolita, as well as visualkei inspired clothing such as Mori, Fairy Kei and Decora The lolita style spread quickly from the Kansai region and finally reached Tokyo, partly due to the economic difficulties there was a big growth in the cuteness and youth cultures that originated in the seventies.

In the late nineties, the Jingu Bashi (also called the Harajuku Bridge) became known as meeting place for youth who wore lolita and other alternative fashion, and lolita became more popular causing a spurt of lolita Fashion selling warehouses. Important magazines that contributed to the spread of the fashion style were the Gothic & Lolita Bible (2001), a spin-off of the popular Japanese fashion magazine  (1998), and FRUiTS (1997). It was around this time when interest and awareness of Lolita Fashion began entering countries outside of Japan, with The Gothic & Lolita Bible being translated into English, distributed outside of Japan through the publisher Tokyopop, and FRUits publishing an English picture book of the Japanese Street Fashion in 2001. As the style became further popularized through the Internet, more shops opened abroad, such as Baby, The Stars Shine Bright in Paris (2007) and in New York (2014).

Over time, the youth that gathered in Harajuku or at Harajuku Bridge disappeared. One possible explanation is that the introduction of fast fashion from retailers H&M and Forever 21 has caused a reduction in the consumption of street fashion. FRUiTS ceased publication while Gothic & Lolita Bible was put on hiatus in 2017.

Sources of inspiration 

European culture has influenced Lolita fashion. The book Alice in Wonderland (1865), written by Lewis Carroll, has inspired many different brands and magazines, such as Alice Deco. The reason that the character Alice was an inspiration source for the Lolita, was because she was an ideal icon for the Shōjo (shoujo)-image, meaning an image of eternal innocence and beauty. The first complete translation of the book was published by Maruyama Eikon in 1910, translated under the title Ai-chan No Yume Monogatari (Fantastic stories of Ai). Another figure from the Rococo that served as a source of inspiration was Marie Antoinette; a manga The Rose of Versailles (Lady Oscar) based on her court, was created in 1979.

Popularization 

People who have popularized the Lolita fashion were Yukari Tamura, Mana and Novala Takemoto. Novala wrote the light novel Kamikaze Girls (2002) about the relationship between Momoko, a lolita girl and Ichigo, a Yanki. The book was adapted into a movie and a manga in 2004. Novala himself claims that "There are no leaders within the lolita world". Mana is a musician and is known for popularizing the Gothic Lolita fashion. He played in the rock band Malice Mizer (1992–2001) and founded the heavy metal band Moi Dix Mois (2002–present). Both bands are a part of the visual kei movement, whose members are known for eccentric expressions and elaborate costumes. He founded his own fashion label, known as Moi-même-Moitié in 1999, which specializes in Gothic Lolita. They are both very interested in the Roccoco period.

The government of Japan has also tried to popularize Lolita fashion. The Minister of Foreign Affairs in February 2009, assigned models to spread Japanese pop culture. These people were given the title of Kawaa Taishi (ambassadors of cuteness). The first three ambassadors of cuteness were model Misako Aoki, who represents the Lolita style of frills-and-lace, Yu Kimura who represents the Harajuku style, and Shizuka Fujioka who represents the school-uniform-styled fashion. Another way that Japan tries to popularize Japanese street fashion and Lolita is by organizing the international Harajuku walk in Japan, this should caused that other foreign countries would organize a similar walk.

Possible reasons for the popularity of Lolita fashion outside of Japan are a big growth in the interest of Japanese culture and use of the internet as a place to share information, leading to an increase in worldwide shopping, and the opportunity of enthusiastic foreign Lolitas to purchase fashion. The origin of the Japanese influences can be found in the late nineties, in which cultural goods such as Hello Kitty, Pokémon, and translated mangas appeared in the west. Anime was already being imported to the west in the early nineties, and scholars also mention that anime and manga caused the popularity of Japanese culture to rise. This is supported by the idea that cultural streams have been going from Japan to the west, and from the west to Japan.

Motives 
Lolita is seen as a reaction against stifling Japanese society, in which young people are pressured to strictly adhere to gender roles and the expectations and responsibilities that are part of these roles. Wearing fashion inspired by childhood clothing is a reaction against this. This can be explained from two perspectives. Firstly, that it is a way to escape adulthood and to go back to the eternal beauty of childhood. Secondly, that it is an escape to a fantasy world, in which an ideal identity can be created that would not be acceptable in daily life.

Some Lolitas say they enjoy the dress of the subculture simply because it is fun and not as a protest against traditional Japanese society. Other motives could be that wearing the fashion style increases their self-confidence or to express an alternative identity.

Social-economical dimension 
Many of the very early lolitas in the 1990s hand-made most of their clothing, and were inspired by the Dolly Kei movement of the previous decade. Because of the diffusion of fashion magazines people were able to use lolita patterns to make their own clothing. Another way to own lolita was to buy it second-hand. The do-it-yourself behaviour can be seen more frequently by people who cannot afford the expensive brands.

Once more retail stores began selling lolita fashion, it became less common for lolitas to make their own clothing. Partly due to the rise of e-commerce and globalization, lolita clothing became more widely accessible with the help of the Internet. The market was quickly divided into multiple components: one which purchases mainly from Japanese or Chinese internet marketplaces, the other making use of shopping services to purchase Japanese brands, with some communities making larger orders as a group. Not every online shop delivers quality lolita (inspired) products, a notorious example is Milanoo (2014). Some web shops sell brand replicas, which is frowned upon by many in this community. A Chinese replica manufacturer that is famous for his replica design is Oo Jia. Second-hand shopping is also an alternative to buying new pieces as items can be bought at a lower price (albeit with varying item condition) and is the sole method of obtaining pieces that are no longer produced by their respective brand.

Sociocultural dimension 
Many lolitas consider being photographed without permission to be rude and disrespectful, however some rules differ or overlap in different parts of this community. Lolitas often host meetings in public spaces such as parks, restaurants, cafes, shopping malls, public events, and festivals. Some meetings take place at members' homes, and often have custom house rules (e.g. each member must bring their own cupcake to the meeting). Lolita meetings therefore are a social aspect of the lolita fashion community, serving as an opportunity for members to meet one another. Many lolitas also used to use Livejournal to communicate, but many have switched to Facebook groups in the interim.

Terminology 
Lolita fashion did not emerge until after the publication of the novel Lolita (1955), which was written by Vladimir Nabokov, the first translation of the novel in Japanese appearing in 1959. The novel is about a middle-aged man, Humbert Humbert, who grooms and abuses a twelve-year-old girl nicknamed Lolita. Because the book focused on the controversial subject of pedophilia and underage sexuality, "Lolita" soon developed a negative connotation referring to a girl inappropriately sexualized at a very young age and associated with unacceptable sexual obsession. In Japan, however, discourse around the novel instead built on the country's romanticized girls' culture (shōjo bunka), and instead came to be a positive synonym for the "sweet and adorable" adolescent girl, without a perverse or sexual connotation.

Lolita was made into a movie in 1962, which was sexualized and did not show the disinterest that Dolores (the character in Nabokov's novel to whom the nickname "Lolita" is given) had in sexuality. A remake was made in 1997. The 17-year-old Amy Fisher, who attempted to murder the wife of her 35-year-old lover and whose crime was made into a film called The Amy Fisher Story (1993), was often called the Long Island Lolita. These films reinforced the sexual association. Other racy connotations were created by Lolita Nylon advertisements (1964) and other media that used Lolita in sexual contexts.

Within Japanese culture the name refers to cuteness and elegance rather than to sexual attractiveness. Many lolitas in Japan are not aware that lolita is associated with Nabokov's book and they are disgusted by it when they discover such relation. The Japanese sense of "Lolita" also appears in lolicon (from "Lolita complex"), a term associated with Russell Trainer's novel  The Lolita Complex (1966, translated 1969) and associated with otaku (anime and manga fan) culture. The concept and genre of media reflects a blend between the aesthetic of kawaii and sexual themes in fiction.

Another common confusion is between the Lolita fashion style and cosplay. Although both spread from Japan, they are different and should be perceived as independent from each other; one is a fashion style while the other is role-play, with clothing and accessory being used to play a character. This does not exclude that there may be some overlap between members of both groups. This can be seen at anime conventions such as the convention in Götenborg in which cosplay and Japanese fashion is mixed. For some Lolitas, it is insulting if people label their outfit as a costume.

Gallery

See also 
 Kamikaze Girls
 Kogal
 Novala Takemoto

References

Citations

General references

Further reading and documentaries 
 Lolitas Of Amsterdam | Style Out There | Refinery29 (documentary) at YouTube
 Lolita Fashion documentaries (documentaires) playlist at YouTube
 List of Lolita brands at Tumblr (archived version at archive, 14 August 2017 version)
 Rebels in Frills: a Literature Review on Lolita Subculture at Academia (thesis) from South Carolina Honors College
 Shoichi Aoki Interview (2003) founder of the street fashion magazine FRUiTS at ABC Australia (archived version at archive, 14 August 2017 version)
 The Tea Party Club's 5th Anniversary starring Juliette et Justine: Q&A (2012) at Jame World (archived version at archive, 14 August 2017 version)
 Innocent World Tea Party in Vienna: Q&A (2013) at Jame World (archived version at archive, 14 August 2017 version)
 The Tea Party Club Presents: Revelry Q&A (2014) at Jame World (archived version at archive, 14 August 2017 version)

External links 

Japan Lolita Association
Lolita library of brands

 
21st-century fashion
Fashion aesthetics
Gothic fashion
History of fashion
Japanese fashion
Japanese subcultures